Campbell is the primary hamlet and a census-designated place (CDP) in the town of Campbell in Steuben County, New York, United States. As of the 2010 census, it had a population of 713, out of 3,406 in the entire town of Campbell.

The community is in eastern Steuben County, in the western part of the town of Campbell. It is on the northeast side of the Cohocton River, a southeast-flowing tributary of the Chemung River and part of the Susquehanna River watershed. New York State Route 415 runs along the northeast edge of the CDP, and Interstate 86 passes more centrally through the CDP, just east of the hamlet's center. Access from I-86 is from Exit 41 (Main Street). I-86 and NY 415 lead southeast  to Corning and northwest  to Bath.

Demographics

References 

Census-designated places in Steuben County, New York
Census-designated places in New York (state)